Zanyukhcha is a rural locality (a village) and the administrative center of Nyukhchenskoye Rural Settlement of Pinezhsky District, Arkhangelsk Oblast, Russia. The population was 335 as of 2010. There are 6  streets.

Geography 
Zanyukhcha is located on the Nyukhcha River, 151 km southeast of Karpogory (the district's administrative centre) by road. Nyukhcha is the nearest rural locality, just across the Nyukcha.

References 

Rural localities in Pinezhsky District